The Trocadero Transfer was an after hours dance club in San Francisco from its opening in December 1977 to the late 1990s. It was located at 520 4th Street at Bryant in the SoMa neighborhood. In 2000, the club was bought by a new owner, remodeled, and renamed to the Glas Kat. In late 2011, the club was again remodeled, and the name was changed to The Grand.

History
The Trocadero Transfer was founded by Dick Collier. The club stayed open on Saturday nights until 6 a.m. The entire Golden Gate Business Association (San Francisco's Gay business association) had to go down to the San Francisco Board of Permit Appeals to make sure that the Trocadero got its after hours license, and even then it was a while before the club was allowed to serve alcohol after hours.
 People came to the Trocadero after the I-Beam closed at 2 a.m., and after the Trocadero closed at 6 a.m., those who still wanted to dance could after 1980 go to The EndUp, which opened at 6 a.m. Sunday morning.

Description of the dance space
Somewhat off-center of the dance floor, there was a narrow metal spiral staircase with clear plastic arms that went up from the dance floor to the balcony above where people could watch the dancers below. This spiral staircase was sometimes called The Crystal Staircase. ("Crystal Staircase" is a slang term used by gay African Americans. It refers to situations where someone has an easy life [someone who is born wealthy, has received a large inheritance, has gotten a job that is a sinecure, etc.]. Of course, crystal also refers to methamphetamine, which many patrons of the club took to stay up all night dancing.) Gender illusionists made a great show of ascending or descending the crystal staircase.

Hanging from the ceiling at the center of the dance floor, there was the hypnotic mirror ball cluster—about a dozen mirror balls of various sizes which continually spun around and were the focus of the dance floor.

DJs
Some of the DJs who played at the Trocadero included paul naif  Bobby Viteritti (the primary DJ at the Trocadero when it was at its zenith from 1978 to 1981), Patrick Cowley, Gary Tighe, Michael Whitehead, Michael Lewis, Billy Langenheim and Rex Bailey on Lights, Steve Smith, Ralph Zepeda, Rob Kimbel, Lester Temple, Michael Garrett, Robbie Leslie, Trip (Tripper) Ringwald and Steve Fabus. Craig Morey was Bobby's opening DJ (playing early in the evening) in 1980 and 1981. Brad Blair, primary DJ at Studio One in Los Angeles in 1979, played there on August 22, 1982. Joseph Watt played there as well, bringing a rock sound to the club.

Disco parties
There were many disco parties (the smaller, local one-night predecessors in the late 1970s and during the 1980s of what became after 1990 the much larger multi-day circuit parties) at the Trocadero. The names of some of these parties were the White Party (held Easter weekend), the Black Party (held the weekends before Walpurgis night and Halloween, at which many danced in skimpy black leather outfits), and the Red Party (held the weekend before Valentine's Day). At the height of the AIDS epidemic, because fewer people were going out dancing, from 1987 to 1989, the Trocadero was partially closed down and only hosted Disco Parties and special events.

Clubs (1989-2011)
In the spring of 1989, at the suggestion of Steve Fabus, San Francisco gay dance party promoter Gus Bean began his first house music club at the Trocadero, the Crew Club.

A couple of times in the early 1990s, San Francisco's first massive rave, the Toontown Club was held at the Trocadero.

In 1995 and 1996, the Temple Club, a gay nightclub, was held at the Trocadero Transfer on Saturday nights.

Bondage-a-Go-Go
The Bondage-a-Go-Go fetish club began on Wednesday nights in early 1993 and continued at the Trocadero until 2000, when it moved to the Cat Club on Wednesday nights at 1190 Folsom Street near 8th Street. In 2004 it moved back to the Glas Kat (the successor nightclub to the Trocadero at 520 4th Street). In 2011, due to the remodeling, Bondage-a-Go-Go moved back to the Cat Club again and decided not to go back after the Glas Kat was remodeled into the Grand Ballroom, remaining at the Cat Club until 2021 when the club night was dissolved during the global COVID-19 pandemic.

Death Guild
The other long-running club at the Trocadero was Death Guild, which moved to the Troc in 1992 from the Pit (after one night at DNA Lounge). This gothic industrial club ran on Mondays at the Trocadero until 1997, returning to the space as the Glas Cat in 2003 and continuing there until late 2008, when it returned to DNA Lounge (although it was briefly replaced at the Glas Kat by a now-defunct club called Deathwish). Also in the mid-1990s Death Guild spawned a theme camp of the same name at Burning Man, widely known for its Thunderdome, first built in 1999.

Nostalgia parties since 2000
When the Trocadero was remodeled in 2000 and renamed the Glas Kat, the Crystal Staircase was removed. Before the Glas Kat remodel, a large birdcage-like go-go dance cage resided on a corner of the stage in the club since 1989. In the mid 1990s, a second similar cage was hung from the ceiling. In early 2007, the original cage was hung on the ceiling. In 2009, the cage was taken out.

From 2000 to 2011, a number of Trocadero Transfer disco nostalgia events were held at the Glas Kat. These are called the Play Party and the Remember the Party parties. At these parties, the original sound of the Trocadero in the late 1970s and early 1980s was reproduced by today's DJs (the Glas Kat had go-go boxes to dance on, which did not exist in the original Trocadero). Some DJs played at the Remember the Party party who played at the original Trocadero Transfer during the 1980s.

Notable performers

 AFI
 Claudja Barry
 Angela Bofill
 Taka Boom
 Boys Town Gang
 Pattie Brooks
 Jocelyn Brown
 The Call
 Jean Carne
 Charo
 Cheap Trick
 Linda Clifford
 Course of Empire
 Crash Worship
 The Dickies
 Dio
 Divine
 Dub Narcotic Sound System
 Exodus
 Einstuerzende Neubauten
 First Choice
 The Flirts
 Fugazi
 Taana Gardner
 Gary's Gang
 Gloria Gaynor
 Edwin Hawkins
 Nona Hendryx
 Loleatta Holloway
 Thelma Houston
 Information Society
 Switchblade Symphony
 Chris Isaak
 Debbie Jacobs
 France Joli
 Grace Jones
 Madleen Kane
 Chaka Khan
 Eartha Kitt
 Patti LaBelle
 The Legendary Pink Dots
 Lime
 Marilyn Manson
 My Life with the Thrill Kill Kult
 Edith Massey
 Armistead Maupin (reading excerpts from Tales of the City)
 Denise McCann
 Ullanda McCullough
 The Mighty Mighty Bosstones
 Misfits
 The Mr. T Experience
 Jackie Moore
 David Naughton
 Negativland
 NOFX
 Dennis Parker
 Paul Parker
 Prong
 The Queers
 Fonda Rae
 The Raes
 Sharon Redd
 The Ritchie Family
 Vicki Sue Robinson
 David Lee Roth
 Marlena Shaw
 Slayer
 Gino Soccio
 Candi Staton
 Swervedriver
 Sylvester
 Teenage Fanclub
 The Three Degrees
 Tool
 Jeanie Tracy
 Train
 Luther Vandross
 The Village People
 The Weather Girls
 Mary Wells
 Viola Wills
 Neil Young
 Pia Zadora

See also
 Trocadero – a San Francisco road house, gambling joint, and dance hall that existed from 1892 to 1930.

References

Further reading
 Diebold, David Tribal Rites:San Francisco's Dance Music Phenomenon Northridge, California:1986—Time Warp Publishing--"Trocadero Transfer"  Pages 128-143.

External links
 Pictures of the Trocadero and reminiscences about the Trocadero from the website discomusic.com
 Grand Nightclub - San Francisco - Website of the current nightclub occupying the space

Defunct LGBT nightclubs in California
Music venues in San Francisco
Nightclubs in San Francisco
LGBT culture in San Francisco
Event venues established in 1977
1977 establishments in California